At the 1951 Pan American Games a men's rowing competition was held. Events were held in Buenos Aires, Argentina, between 25 February and 3 March.


Medal summary

Medal table

References
 Pan American Games 1951 results 
 
 
  .

1951
Rowing
Pan American Games
1951 Pan American Games